Lauren Elizabeth Poetschka (born 22 October 1974) is a retired Australian hurdler who specialized in the 400 metres hurdles.

She competed at the 1994 Commonwealth Games, the 1997 Summer Universiade, the 1999 Summer Universiade and the 2000 Summer Olympics without reaching the final.

Her personal best time was 55.37 seconds, achieved in March 2000 in Melbourne.

She is a sister of Olympic sprinter Renee Poetschka.

References

1974 births
Living people
Australian female hurdlers
Olympic athletes of Australia
Athletes (track and field) at the 2000 Summer Olympics
Commonwealth Games competitors for Australia
Athletes (track and field) at the 1994 Commonwealth Games
21st-century Australian women
20th-century Australian women